In mathematics, Laver tables (named after Richard Laver, who discovered them towards the end of the 1980s in connection with his works on set theory) are tables of numbers that have certain properties of algebraic and combinatorial interest.  They occur in the study of racks and quandles.

Definition 

For any nonnegative integer n, the n-th Laver table is the 2n × 2n table whose entry in the cell at row p and column q (1 ≤ p,q ≤ 2n) is defined as

where  is the unique binary operation that satisfies the following two equations for all p, q in {1,...,2n}:

and 

Note: Equation uses the notation  to mean the unique member of {1,...,2n} congruent to x modulo 2n.

Equation is known as the (left) self-distributive law, and a set endowed with any binary operation satisfying this law is called a shelf. Thus, the n-th Laver table is just the multiplication table for the unique shelf ({1,...,2n}) that satisfies Equation.

Examples: Following are the first five Laver tables, i.e. the multiplication tables for the shelves ({1,...,2n}), n = 0, 1, 2, 3, 4:

There is no known closed-form expression to calculate the entries of a Laver table directly, but Patrick Dehornoy provides a simple algorithm for filling out Laver tables.

Properties 

 For all p, q in {1,...,2n}: .
 For all p in {1,...,2n}:  is periodic with period πn(p) equal to a power of two.
 For all p,q:

Are the First-row Periods Unbounded? 

Looking at just the first row in the n-th Laver table, for n = 0, 1, 2,..., the entries in each first row are seen to be periodic with a period that's always a power of two, as mentioned in Property 2 above. The first few periods are 1, 1, 2, 4, 4, 8, 8, 8, 8, 16, 16, ... . This sequence is nondecreasing, and in 1995 Richard Laver proved--under the assumption that there exists a rank-into-rank (a large cardinal property)--that it actually increases without bound. (It is not known whether this is also provable in ZFC without the additional large-cardinal axiom.) In any case, it grows extremely slowly; Randall Dougherty showed that 32 cannot appear in this sequence (if it ever does) until n > A(9,A(8,A(8,254))), where A denotes the Ackermann–Péter function.

References

Further reading 
 .
 .
 Shelves and the infinite: https://johncarlosbaez.wordpress.com/2016/05/06/shelves-and-the-infinite/

Mathematical logic
Combinatorics